Michael Senft (born 28 September 1972 in Bad Kreuznach) is a German slalom canoeist who competed from the mid-1990s to the mid-2000s (decade). Competing in three Summer Olympics, he won a bronze medal in the C2 event in 1996 in Atlanta.

Senft also won six medals at the ICF Canoe Slalom World Championships with a gold (C2: 2005), three silvers (C2: 1997, C2 team: 2002, 2003) and two bronzes (C2 team: 1995, 1997). He earned three more medals at the European Championships (1 gold, 1 silver and 1 bronze).

His partner in the boat for most of his career was André Ehrenberg. From 2004 he paddled with Christian Bahmann.

World Cup individual podiums

1 World Championship counting for World Cup points

References

External links
 

1972 births
Canoeists at the 1996 Summer Olympics
Canoeists at the 2000 Summer Olympics
Canoeists at the 2004 Summer Olympics
German male canoeists
Living people
Olympic canoeists of Germany
Olympic bronze medalists for Germany
Olympic medalists in canoeing
Medalists at the 1996 Summer Olympics
Medalists at the ICF Canoe Slalom World Championships
People from Bad Kreuznach
Sportspeople from Rhineland-Palatinate